Encapsulating peritoneal sclerosis (EPS) is a medical condition that causes the encapsulation of feces within a thickened fibrocollagenous peritoneal membrane, which leads to recurrent episodes of bowel obstruction. It is a rare serious complication typically caused by peritoneal dialysis.

References

Digestive system